The 2019–20 season is the first in the history of Western United Football Club. The club competed in the A-League for the first time though it did not compete in the FFA Cup.

On 24 March 2020, the FFA announced that the 2019–20 A-League season would be postponed until further notice due to the COVID-19 pandemic in Australia and New Zealand. The season resumed on 17 July 2020.

Players

Transfers

Transfers in

Transfers out

Contract extensions

Club

Kits
The kit supplier is Kappa. At the start of the inaugural season, Probuild was announced as Western United's main kit sponsor, with Hyundai sponsoring the sleeves.

Technical staff
Football Department

Pre-season and friendlies

Competitions

Overall record

A-League

League table

Results summary

Results by round

Matches

Finals series

Statistics

Appearances and goals
Players with no appearances not included in the list.

Disciplinary record

References

Western United FC seasons
2019–20 A-League season by team